Georgios Doitsinis was a significant Greek chieftain of the Greek Struggle for Macedonia.

Doitsinis was born in the 1880s in Matsikovo (renamed Evzonoi in 1927) of Kilkis. He was the grandson of the Kodjabashi of Matsikovo Georgios Doitsinis, who had successfully defended several early Bulgarian activities. He was one of the first revolutionaries to set up an armed group in the areas of Bogdanci and Gevgelija, cooperating with the Greek Center of Thessaloniki since the autumn of 1904. His group consisted of local Macedonian and Cretan soldiers. He cooperated with chieftains Michael Sionidis, L. Papamalekos and Em. Katsigaris.

After the arrest of multiple Greek revolutionaries in Bogdanci and the dissolution of the group of Em. Katsigaris, Doitsinis was one of the most powerful Greek military presences in Central Macedonia. He managed with his group to defend the Bulgarian Komitadji attacks near Axios, from Karasouli (now Polykastro) to Valandovo and from Gevgelija to the mountain range of Kerkini.

References 

Year of birth uncertain
Year of death unknown
Greek people of the Macedonian Struggle
Greek Macedonians
Macedonian revolutionaries (Greek)
People from Kilkis (regional unit)